Kay Starr: Jazz Singer is a studio album by Kay Starr. It was released in 1960 by Capitol Records (catalog no. T-1438). It was produced by Dave Cavanaugh, and the music was arranged and conducted by Van Alexander.

AllMusic also gave the album a rating of four stars. Reviewer Dave Nathan wrote that Starr "swings a set of 12 songs" and "this album helps document her place as a top-flight jazz vocalist."

Track listing
Side A
 "I Never Knew" (Egan, Marsh, Pitts, Whiteman) [2:42]
 "My Man" (Charles, Pollack, Willemetz, Yvain) [2:36]
 "Breezin' Along with the Breeze" (Gillespie, Simons, Whiting) [1:52]
 "All by Myself" (Irving Berlin) [3:00]
 "Hard Headed Hannah" (Ager, Bates, Bigelow, Yellen) [2:29]
 "Me Too" (Sherman, Tobias, Woods) [1:58]

Side B
 "Happy Days and Lonely Nights" (Fisher, Rose) [2:48]
 "I Only Want a Buddy -- Not a Sweetheart" (Eddie Jones) [3:09]
 "Hummin' to Myself" (Fain, Magidson, Siegel, Siegel) [2:55]
 "My Honey's Lovin' Arms" (Meyer, Ruby) [2:45]
 "Sunday" (Conn, Coots, Grey, Krueger, Miller, Styne) [3:04]
 "I Would Do Anything for You" (Hill, Hopkins, Williams) [2:48]

References

1960 albums
Kay Starr albums
Capitol Records albums